The Categoriae decem ('Ten Categories'), also known as the Paraphrasis Themistiana, is a Latin summary of the Categories of Aristotle. It is thought to date to the fourth century AD. Once and traditionally attributed to Augustine of Hippo, it is no longer thought to be his work.

From the eighth century onwards, this text became one of the major sources of logical teaching in medieval Europe, where it was taken at times as a full translation of Aristotle's work, rather than a compression. Its importance rests in the revival of the study of logic it stimulated in the early medieval West, beginning, it would seem, at the court of Charlemagne. Those influenced included Alcuin, particularly in his De Dialectica, Fridugisus and Johannes Scotus Eriugena.

From around the eleventh century the influence of the Categoriae decem waned, as translations of the original work of Aristotle gained currency in Western Europe.

Notes

References
Edition in the Aristoteles Latinus, editor Lorenzo Minio-Paluello: Categoriae vel Praedicamenta. Translatio Boethii, Editio Composite, Translatio Guillelmi de Moerbeka, Lemmata e Simplicii commentario decerpta, Pseudo-Augustini Paraphrasis Themistiana - Desclée De Brouwer (Bruges-Paris 1961).

Works about Aristotle
Translations into Latin
Ancient Roman philosophical literature